Mark G. Alford (born 3 July 1962) is a theoretical physicist and chair of the Department of Physics at Washington University in St. Louis. He researches dense matter inside neutron stars.

Alford received his bachelor's degree with first-class honors from Oxford in 1984 and his master's and doctoral degrees from Harvard in 1988 and 1990, respectively, under the supervision of Sidney Coleman. Afterwards he held postdoctoral positions at the University of California, Santa Barbara Institute for Theoretical Physics (now the Kavli Institute), Cornell's Laboratory of Nuclear Studies, the Institute for Advanced Study, and the MIT Center for Theoretical Physics. He became a lecturer at the University of Glasgow in 2000, before becoming professor at Washington University in 2003. He is currently chair of the Washington University Physics Department. He is a fellow of the American Physical Society.

References

Washington University physicists
MIT Center for Theoretical Physics alumni
Alumni of the University of Oxford
Harvard University alumni
Year of birth missing (living people)
Living people
Fellows of the American Physical Society
Academics of the University of Glasgow
Theoretical physicists
Washington University in St. Louis faculty